Phymorhynchus carinatus is a species of sea snail, a marine gastropod mollusk in the family Raphitomidae.

Description
The length of the shell attains 15 mm.

Distribution
This bathyal species occurs on the Logatchev site of the Mid-Atlantic Ridge, at a depth of 3,000 m.

References

 Warén A. & Bouchet P. (2001). Gastropoda and Monoplacophora from hydrothermal vents and seeps new taxa and records. The Veliger, 44(2): 116-231

External links
 Gastropods.com: Phymorhynchus carinatus

carinatus
Gastropods described in 2001